Nebria arkansana is a species of ground beetle in the Nebriinae subfamily that can be found in Canada and in US states such as Colorado, Montana, Utah, and Wyoming.

References

arkansana
Beetles described in 1913
Beetles of North America